The Men's 10000m race for class T54 wheelchair athletes at the 2004 Summer Paralympics were held in the Athens Olympic Stadium on 19 & 21 September. The event consisted of 2 heats and a final, and was won by Joël Jeannot, representing .

1st round

Heat 1
19 Sept. 2004, 22:00

Heat 2
19 Sept. 2004, 22:30

Final round

21 Sept. 2004, 19:05

References

M